Metreveli is a Georgian surname. Notable people include:
 Aleksandre Metreveli, Georgian tennis player
 Alex Metreveli, Georgian tennis player
 Roin Metreveli, Georgian historian, first elected rector of the Tbilisi State University
 Shota and Margarita Metreveli, Georgian artists
 Slava Metreveli, Soviet-Georgian footballer

Surnames of Abkhazian origin
Georgian-language surnames
Surnames of Georgian origin